Sir George Barclay (c. 1636–1710) was a Scottish army officer who headed a Jacobite assassination plot against King William II of Scotland in 1696. The plotters intended to ambush the king at Turnham Green in London on returning from a hunting party. The plot was betrayed to the government, and nine members were executed, though Barclay escaped to France.

References 

from a dictionary of dates by Thomas Nelsonand sons c 1906
Vincent, Benjamin. "Assassination Plot" in Haydn's Dictionary of Dates and Universal Information Relating to All Ages. 19th Edition. Ward, Lock and Co. London, New York and Melbourne. 1889. Volume 1. pp. 59–60. Google Books.

External links 

1630s births
1710 deaths
Scottish Jacobites
Scottish soldiers